Wharton Township is the name of some places in the U.S. state of Pennsylvania:
Wharton Township, Fayette County, Pennsylvania
Wharton Township, Potter County, Pennsylvania

Pennsylvania township disambiguation pages